Aston Upthorpe Downs is a  biological Site of Special Scientific Interest south of Aston Upthorpe in Oxfordshire. It is a Nature Conservation Review site, Grade I. 

This site is a set of dry valleys in the Berkshire Downs. Most of it is chalk grassland which has a rich variety of flora and fauna, and there are also areas of mixed woodland and juniper scrub. Flora include the nationally uncommon wild candytuft and the only population in the county of the rare pasque flower.

References

 
Sites of Special Scientific Interest in Oxfordshire
Nature Conservation Review sites